The qualifying round for UEFA Euro 1980 consisted of 31 teams divided into seven groups; three of five teams and four of four teams. The qualifying round (drawn in Rome on 30 November 1977) was played at various times between May 1978 and February 1980, with some groups concluding earlier than others.

Qualified teams

{| class="wikitable sortable"
|-
! Team
! Qualified as
! Qualified on
! data-sort-type="number"|Previous appearances in tournament
|-
|  ||  ||  || 1 (1968)
|-
|  || Group 6 winner ||  || 0 (debut)
|-
|  || Group 1 winner ||  || 1 (1968)
|-
|  || Group 4 winner ||  || 1 (1976)
|-
|  || Group 5 winner ||  || 2 (1960, 1976)
|-
|  || Group 3 winner ||  || 1 (1964)
|-
|  || Group 2 winner ||  || 1 (1972)
|-
|  || Group 7 winner ||  || 2 (1972, 1976)
|-
|}

Summary

Tiebreakers
If two or more teams finished level on points after completion of the group matches, the following tie-breakers were used to determine the final ranking:
 Greater number of points in all group matches
 Goal difference in all group matches
 Greater number of goals scored in all group matches
 Drawing of lots

Groups
Four groups of four teams and three groups of five teams competed for qualification for UEFA Euro 1980. The teams played home and away matches against the other teams in their group. The seven teams that acquired the most points to win their respective group qualified for the main tournament, joining the host nation Italy.

Group 1

Group 2

Group 3

Group 4

Group 5

Group 6

Group 7

Goalscorers

References

External links
 UEFA Euro 1980 at UEFA.com

 
1980
1978–79 in European football
UEFA Euro 1980